Remember That is the eighth EP of the South Korean boy group, BTOB. It was released on March 28, 2016. It is also the third installment to the BTOB's ballad trilogy, promoting the lead single "Remember That". BTOB's own members participated in the production of all the songs in this album.

Release
On March 17, Cube Entertainment announced that BTOB will be making a comeback on March 28 with its 8th Mini Album "Remember That". Photo and video teasers for the album were released from March 20–26.

The tracks "Remember That" and "So Pretty" were performed to fans beforehand on BTOB's encore concert Born to Beat Time that was held on March 27–28. Before the official comeback, BTOB appeared on the live broadcasting app "V App" in which they held a special event for "Remember That".

Promotion
The group made their first official comeback stage on March 31 at Mnet's M Countdown, performing the tracks "Remember That" and "So Pretty". They received their first music show trophy for this album on MBC Music's Show Champion. They received their 2nd, and 3rd trophies on Mnet's M Countdown, and KBS's Music Bank which also marks their first public music broadcast win since 1480 days of debut.

Music video
On March 28, they released the four-minute music video for "Remember That" on Naver's V app and also on their official YouTube channel. The music video features a drama-style format that is starred by member Lee Minhyuk and actress Jo Bo-ah. It shows a man reminiscing his memories with his ex-lover during spring time.

Track list 
※ Track in bold is the title track in the album.

Chart performance

Music program wins

References

External links

2016 EPs
BtoB (band) EPs
Cube Entertainment EPs
Korean-language EPs